Lloret de Vistalegre, also known as Llorito, is a municipality located in the center of Majorca, one of the Balearic Islands, Spain.

The municipalities bordering Lloret de Vistalegre are: Montuïri, Sineu, Sencelles, Algaida y Sant Joan.

At the beginning of August there is a major party called "Es Sequer", which is a gastronomical celebration of the fig harvest.

The municipality activities are mainly revolved around agriculture, livestock and some rural tourism establishments.

References

External links 
 Lloret de Vistalegre tourist guide and information
 Map of Lloret de Vistalegre
 

Municipalities in Mallorca
Populated places in Mallorca